Tomáš Ficenc (born December 28, 1977) is a Czech professional ice hockey defenceman. He played with HC Vítkovice in the Czech Extraliga during the 2010–11 Czech Extraliga season.

Career statistics

References

External links
 Hokey.cz Tomáš Ficenc

1977 births
BK Havlíčkův Brod players
Czech ice hockey defencemen
HC Dukla Jihlava players
HC Slovan Ústečtí Lvi players
HC Vítkovice players
Living people
MsHK Žilina players
Sportspeople from Jihlava
Czech expatriate ice hockey players in Slovakia